Ellen Tittel (later Wellmann, later Wessinghage, born 28 June 1948) is a retired West German middle-distance runner who specialized in the 1500 m event. She won the European indoor title in 1973, placing third in 1975, and had another third-place finish at the 1971 European Outdoor Championships. She reached the 1500 m finals at the 1972 and 1976 Summer Olympics, but abandoned the 1972 race due to stomach cramps. In 1971 she helped to set a new world record in the 4 × 800 m relay.

Domestically Tittel set a national record in 1969 and won the national title in 1970-76. In 1975 she was chosen the German Sportspersonality of the Year.

Tittel is a lawyer by profession. Before turning to athletics she tried gymnastics, but found it too boring. She married two fellow Olympic middle-distance runners, first Paul-Heinz Wellmann, and a few years later Thomas Wessinghage. With Wessinghage she has a son Daniel.

References

1948 births
Living people
People from Sächsische Schweiz-Osterzgebirge
German female middle-distance runners
Sportspeople from Saxony
Olympic athletes of West Germany
Athletes (track and field) at the 1972 Summer Olympics
Athletes (track and field) at the 1976 Summer Olympics
Universiade medalists in athletics (track and field)
European Athletics Championships medalists
Universiade gold medalists for West Germany